Toğanalı (also, Toganaly and Toganly) is a village and municipality in the Goygol Rayon of Azerbaijan.  It has a population of 989.  The municipality consists of the villages of Toğanalı and Əzgilli.

References 

Populated places in Goygol District